This is a list of notable restaurants in Singapore.

Restaurants 
 Les Amis
 Restaurant André
 Candlenut Kitchen
 Crystal Jade
 Din Tai Fung
 Pizza Hut
 McDonald’s
 KFC
 Jollibee
 Ippudo
 Jack's Place
 L'Atelier de Joël Robuchon
 Long Beach Seafood Restaurant
 Pastamania
 Rhubarb Le Restaurant
 Sakae Sushi
 4 Fingers Crispy Chicken
 Swensen's
 sushi tei

Hawker stalls 

 Hill Street Tai Hwa Pork Noodle
 Hong Kong Soya Sauce Chicken Rice and Noodle

See also
 List of Michelin starred restaurants in Singapore
 List of restaurants
 Singaporean cuisine
 Gastronomy in Singapore

References

Singapore

Restaurants